Emelie Schepp (born September 5, 1979, in Motala) is a Swedish crime author. Her crime novels are centered around Norrköping and focus on the main figure Jana Berzelius, a public prosecutor. In 2013, she made her debut with the crime novel Märkta för livet (English: Marked for Life, trans. Rod Bradbury) which sold 40,000 copies in just six months. She then signed a book deal for three books with Wahlström & Widstrand in the fall of 2014, re-releasing her debut book the same year.

Her four Berzelius books have sold over a million copies worldwide. The rights of the series have been sold to thirty countries, and the books have been translated into Danish, Dutch, English, Estonian, Finnish, French, German, Hungarian, Icelandic, Italian, Japanese, Polish, Spanish and Turkish (January 2019).

Bibliography 
2014 Märkta för livet, Wahlström & Widstrand, 
2016 in English: Marked for Life, trans. Rod Bradbury, Mira (Canada),  
2015 Vita Spår, Wahlström & Widstrand, 
2017  in English: Marked for Revenge, trans. Suzanne Martin Cheadle, Mira (Canada), 
2016 Prio ett, Wahlström & Widstrand, 
2018 in English: Slowly We Die, trans. Suzanne Martin Cheadle, Mira (Canada), 
2017 Pappas pojke, HarperCollins Nordic
2019 Broder Jakob, HarperCollins Nordic
2020 Nio liv, HarperCollins Nordic
2022 Björnen sover, Norstedts

References

External links

Living people
1979 births
Swedish women writers
Swedish crime fiction writers